Jessica Paoletta (born 21 March 1988) is an Italian sprinter.

Biography
Jessica Paoletta participated at one edition of the European Championships (2010), she has 3 caps in national team from 2010.

Achievements

See also
 Italy national relay team
 Italy at the 2013 Mediterranean Games

References

External links
 
 Jessica Paoletta at All-Athletics.com

1988 births
Athletes from Rome
Athletics competitors of Gruppo Sportivo Esercito
Italian female sprinters
Living people
Mediterranean Games gold medalists for Italy
Athletes (track and field) at the 2013 Mediterranean Games
Mediterranean Games medalists in athletics
20th-century Italian women
21st-century Italian women